, known by her stage name  is a Japanese actress and voice actress who works for Aoni Production. She is married to voice actor Banjō Ginga.

Filmography

Television animation
1970s
 Hoka Hoka Kazoku (1976) (Sachiko Yamano)
 Aim for the Ace! (1978) (Michiru Taki)
 Space Battleship Yamato II (1978)
 Lupin III Part II (1978)
 Anne of Green Gables (1979) (Diana Barry)
 Gordian Warrior (Saori Otaki) (1979)
 The Rose of Versailles (1979)
1980s
 Space Runaway Ideon (1980) (Rukuku Kil)
 Braiger (1982) (Anastasia, Eva)
 Space Cobra (1982) (Dominique Royal)
 Game Center Arashi (1982) (Erika Noto)
 Magical Princess Minky Momo (1982) 
 Aura Battler Dunbine (1983)
 Baxinger (1983)
 Giant Gorg (1984) (Lady Links)
 Persia, the Magic Fairy (1984) (Kumi Hayami)
 Mobile Suit Zeta Gundam (1985) (Hilda Bidan)
 The Three-Eyed One (1985) (Chiyoko Wato)
 Touch (1985) (Reiko Kashiwaba)
 Fight! Super Robot Life Form Transformer (1985) (Carly Witwicky)
 Maison Ikkoku (1986) (Asuna's mother)
 Seito Shokun! (1986) (Michiko Kitashiro)
 Fight! Transformers 2010 (1986) (Carly Witwicky)
 Uchūsen Sagittarius (1986) (Beat)
 City Hunter (1987) (Saori Murakoshi)
 Fist of the North Star (1987) (Sayaka)
 F (1988) (Shizue)
 Grimm's Fairy Tale Classics (1988) (Hanna)
 Oishinbo (1988) (Nobuko Mayama)
1990s
 Ginga Sengoku Gun'yūden Rai (1994) (Dokuganryu Masamune)
 Detective Conan (1996) (Eri Kisaki)
 Clamp School Detectives (1997) (Suoh's Mother)
 Cowboy Bebop (1998) (Julia)
 Silent Möbius (1998) (Rosa Cheyenne)
 Crest of the Stars (1999) (Plakia Lexshue)
 Magic User's Club (1999) (Azusa Amano)
 Zoids: Chaotic Century (1999) (President Louise Theresa Camford)
2000s
 Z.O.E. Dolores,i (2001) (Linda Roland)
 Ai Yori Aoshi (2002) (Aoi's Mother)
 Aquarian Age (2002) (Misato Yukimura)
 Atashin'chi (2002) (Emi's Mother)
 Full Metal Panic! (2002) (Female Doctor)
 Ghost in the Shell: Stand Alone Complex (2003) (Seymour)
 Human Crossing (2003) (Mizuho Noguchi)
 Rumic Theater (2003) (Hanako)
 Kenran Butohsai (2004) (MAKI)
 Maria-sama ga Miteru: Printemps (2004) (Yumiko Ikegami)
 Emma: A Victorian Romance (2005) (Dorothea Molders)
 Monster (2005)
 Speed Grapher (2005) (Shinsen Tennouzu)
 Ah! My Goddess: Everyone Has Wings (2006) (Hild)
 Angel Heart (2006) (Woman President)
 Emma: A Victorian Romance Second Act (2007) (Dorothea Molders)
 Devil May Cry: The Animated Series (2007) (Amanda)
 Slayers Revolution (2008) (Gioconda)
2010s
 Chu-Bra!! (2010) (Yōko Sagisawa)
 Jormungand (2012) (Amalia Trohovski)
 Orange (2016) (Kakeru's grandmother)
 Wise Man's Grandchild (2019) (Melinda Bowen)
2020s
 BNA: Brand New Animal (2020) (Barbaray Rose)
 Great Pretender (2020) (Akemi Suzaku)
 The Tale of the Outcasts (2023) (Iberta)

Theatrical animation
 Windaria (1986) (Druid)
 Doraemon: Nobita and the Birth of Japan (1989) (Tsuchidama)
 Silent Möbius (1991) (Lebia Maverick)
 Silent Möbius 2 (1992) (Lebia Maverick)
 Ninja Scroll (1993) (Benisato)
 Memories (1995) (Eva)
 Detective Conan: The Fourteenth Target (1998) (Eri Kisaki)
 Mobile Suit Gundam: The 08th MS Team Miller's Report (1998) (Alice Miller)
 Detective Conan: Captured in Her Eyes (2000) (Eri Kisaki)
 Detective Conan: Magician of the Silver Sky (2004) (Eri Kisaki)
 Mobile Suit Z Gundam: A New Translation - Heirs to the Stars (2005) (Hilda Bidan)
 Detective Conan: The Private Eyes' Requiem (2006) (Eri Kisaki)
 Appleseed Ex Machina (2007) (Athena)
 Dragon Age: Dawn of the Seeker (2012) (Divine)

OVA
 Crying Freeman (1988) (Nina Heaven)
 Mermaid Saga (1993) (Misa)
 Blue Submarine No. 6 (1998) (General Gilford)
 Queen Emeraldas (1998) (Siren)
 Virgin Fleet  (1998) (Hidemaro Hirose)
 Magic User's Club (1996) (Azusa Amano)

Games
The Bouncer (2000) (Kaldea Orchid)
James Bond 007: Everything or Nothing (????) (Agent Mya Starling)
Quiz: Ah! My Goddess (????) (Hild)
Trauma Center: New Blood (????) (Irene Quatro )
Sly 2: Band of Thieves (????) (The Contessa)
Final Fantasy VII Remake (2020) (Elmyra Gainsborough)

Tokusatsu
Seiju Sentai Gingaman (1998) (Spectral Empress Iliess (eps. 1 - 2, 13, 20, 22 - 34)/Evil Empress Iliess (ep. 34))
Seiju Sentai Gingaman vs Denji Sentai Megaranger (1999) (Spectral Empress Iliess)

Drama CDs
7 Seeds (????) (Botan Saotome)

Dubbing

Live-action
Michelle Pfeiffer
Scarface (1991 TV Tokyo edition) (Elvira Hancock)
The Deep End of the Ocean (Beth Cappadora)
A Midsummer Night's Dream (Titania)
New Year's Eve (Ingrid Withers)
Dark Shadows (Elizabeth Collins Stoddard)
The Family (Maggie Blake)
Mother! (woman)
Ant-Man and the Wasp (Janet van Dyne)
The First Lady (Betty Ford)
Ant-Man and the Wasp: Quantumania (Janet van Dyne)
Demi Moore
We're No Angels (Molly)
Ghost (Molly Jensen)
Mortal Thoughts (Cynthia Kellogg)
A Few Good Men (Lieutenant Commander JoAnne Galloway)
The Scarlet Letter (Hester Prynne)
Striptease (Erin Grant)
Charlie's Angels: Full Throttle (Madison Lee)
The Joneses (Kate Jones)
Brave New World (Linda)
Madeleine Stowe
Revenge (1991 TV Asahi edition) (Miryea Mendez)
The Two Jakes (Lillian Bodine)
Unlawful Entry (1997 TV Asahi edition) (Karen Carr)
Bad Girls (1997 TV Asahi edition) (Cody Zamora)
Playing by Heart (Gracie)
Impostor (Maya Olham)
Octane (Senga Wilson)
Rene Russo
Major League (Lynn Wells)
Lethal Weapon 3 (Lorna Cole)
Ransom (Kate Mullen)
Lethal Weapon 4 (Lorna Cole)
Two for the Money (Toni Abrams)
Yours, Mine and Ours (Helen North)
Velvet Buzzsaw (Rhodora Haze)
Sharon Stone
Above the Law (Sara Toscani)
Blood and Sand (Doña Sol)
Total Recall (Lori Quaid)
Scissors (Angie Anderson)
Sphere (Dr. Elizabeth "Beth" Halperin)
Bobby (Miriam Ebbers)
The Burning Plain (Gina)
Carrie Fisher
Star Wars Episode IV: A New Hope (Princess Leia)
The Empire Strikes Back (Princess Leia)
Return of the Jedi (Princess Leia)
The 'Burbs (1992 TV Asahi edition) (Carol Peterson)
Star Wars: The Force Awakens (General Leia Organa)
Star Wars: The Last Jedi (General Leia Organa)
Star Wars: The Rise of Skywalker (General Leia Organa)
Emma Thompson
Love Actually (Karen)
Nanny McPhee (Nanny McPhee)
Last Chance Harvey (Kate Walker)
Nanny McPhee and the Big Bang (Nanny McPhee)
Men in Black 3 (Agent O)
Men in Black: International (Agent O)
Last Christmas (Petra Andrich)
Daryl Hannah
Blade Runner (1986 TBS edition) (Pris Stratton)
Wall Street (1992 TV Asahi edition) (Darien Taylor)
High Spirits (1992 NTV edition) (Mary Plunkett Brogan)
Crazy People (Kathy Burgess)
The Last Days of Frankie the Fly (Margaret)
Barbara Hershey
The Natural (1989 TV Asahi edition) (Harriet Bird)
Hannah and Her Sisters (Lee)
Hoosiers (Myra Fleener)
Beaches (Hillary Whitney)
Falling Down (Elizabeth "Beth" Trevino)
Julia Roberts
Mystic Pizza (Daisy Araujo)
Steel Magnolias (Shelby Eatenton-Latcherie)
Pretty Woman (1994 Fuji TV edition) (Vivian Ward)
Prêt-à-Porter (Anne Eisenhower)
Everyone Says I Love You (Von Sidell)
Mary Steenburgen
Parenthood (Karen Buckman)
The Proposal (Grace Paxton)
Last Vegas (Diana Boyle)
Song One (Karen)
A Walk in the Woods (Jeannie)
Rebecca De Mornay
Risky Business (Lana)
Runaway Train (1988 TBS edition) (Sara)
Backdraft (1995 Fuji TV edition) (Helen McCaffrey)
The Three Musketeers (Milady De Winter / Sabine)
Melanie Griffith
Body Double (Holly Body)
Working Girl (1991 TV Asahi edition) (Tess McGill)
Shining Through (Linda Voss)
Celebrity (Nicole Oliver)
Diane Lane
Vital Signs (Gina Wyler)
Judge Dredd (Judge Hershey)
My Dog Skip (Ellen Morris)
The Glass House (2005 TV Asahi edition) (Erin Glass)
Andie MacDowell
Hudson Hawk (Anna Baragli)
Groundhog Day (Rita Hanson)
Bad Girls (VHS/DVD edition) (Eileen Spenser)
Multiplicity (Laura Kinney)
Meryl Streep
The Iron Lady (Margaret Thatcher)
The Post (Katharine Graham)
Little Women (Aunt March)
Don't Look Up (President Orlean)
Lea Thompson
Back to the Future (1989 TV Asahi edition) (Lorraine Baines McFly)
Back to the Future Part II (1992 TV Asahi edition) (Lorraine Baines McFly)
Back to the Future Part III (1993 TV Asahi edition) (Lorraine Baines McFly)
1911 (Empress Dowager Longyu (Joan Chen))
3 Days to Kill (Christine Renner (Connie Nielsen))
8 Simple Rules (Cate Hennessy (Katey Sagal))
The Absent-Minded Professor (Betsy Carlisle (Nancy Olson))
The Abyss (Dr. Lindsey Brigman (Mary Elizabeth Mastrantonio))
The Addams Family (Morticia Addams (Anjelica Huston))
Airplane! (Elaine Dickinson (Julie Hagerty))
American Ultra (Victoria Lasseter (Connie Britton))
Angel (Hermione (Charlotte Rampling))
Anna and the King (Anna Leonowens (Jodie Foster))
Armour of God II: Operation Condor (Ada (Carol Cheng))
The Assignment (Dr. Rachel Jane (Sigourney Weaver))
The A-Team (Tawnia Baker (Marla Heasley))
Audrey (Mita Ungaro)
Avatar: The Way of Water (Dr. Grace Augustine (Sigourney Weaver))
Bandits (Kate Wheeler (Cate Blanchett))
Batman v Superman: Dawn of Justice (Senator Finch (Holly Hunter))
Burlesque (Tess (Cher))
The Burning Plain (Gina (Kim Basinger))
Cannonball Run II (1988 TV Asahi edition) (Jill Rivers (Susan Anton))
Cat People (1985 Fuji TV edition) (Alice Perrin (Annette O'Toole))
Christine (1990 TV Asahi edition) (Leigh Cabot (Alexandra Paul))
Copycat (1998 TV Tokyo edition) (Inspector Mary Jane "M.J." Monahan (Holly Hunter))
Corky Romano (Agent Kate Russo (Vinessa Shaw))
Cousins (Maria Hardy (Isabella Rossellini))
Cowboy Bebop (Julia (Elena Satine))
Crash (Catherine Ballard (Deborah Kara Unger))
Criminal Minds: Suspect Behavior (Beth Griffith (Janeane Garofalo))
CSI: Crime Scene Investigation (Catherine Willows (Marg Helgenberger))
The Curious Case of Benjamin Button (Elizabeth Abbott (Tilda Swinton))
Dangerous Beauty (Paola Franco (Jacqueline Bisset))
Doc Hollywood (Nancy Lee Nicholson (Bridget Fonda))
Dolittle (Ginko-Who-Soars (Frances de la Tour))
Don't Say a Word (Aggie Conrad (Famke Janssen))
Donnie Darko (Rose Darko (Mary McDonnell))
The Doors (Patricia Kennealy (Kathleen Quinlan))
Dr. Dolittle (Lisa Dolittle (Kristen Wilson))
Dr. Dolittle 2 (Lisa Dolittle (Kristen Wilson))
Dr. Dolittle 3 (Lisa Dolittle (Kristen Wilson))
Dressed to Kill (1991 TV Asahi edition) (Liz Blake (Nancy Allen))
End Game (The First Lady (Anne Archer))
The Equalizer (Susan Plummer (Melissa Leo))
The Equalizer 2 (Susan Plummer (Melissa Leo))
ER (Adele Newman (Erica Gimpel))
The Exorcist (Angela Rance / Regan MacNeil (Geena Davis))
Fargo (2002 TV Tokyo edition) (Marge Gunderson (Frances McDormand))
The First Wives Club (Annie MacDuggan-Paradis (Diane Keaton))
Fierce Creatures (Willa Weston (Jamie Lee Curtis))
A Fish Called Wanda (Wanda Gershwitz (Jamie Lee Curtis))
The Flintstones (Wilma Flintstone (Elizabeth Perkins))
The Gauntlet (1983 Fuji TV edition) (Augustina "Gus" Mally (Sondra Locke))
Genius (Elsa Einstein (Emily Watson))
The Golden Child (1989 Fuji TV edition) (Kee Nang (Charlotte Lewis))
Grudge Match (Sally Rose (Kim Basinger))
Hampstead (Emily Walters (Diane Keaton))
Hard Target (1997 Fuji TV edition) (Natasha Binder (Yancy Butler))
Heat (Justine Hanna (Diane Venora))
Hello, My Name Is Doris (Doris Miller (Sally Field))
Infernal Affairs II (Mary (Carina Lau))
In the Mouth of Madness (Linda Styles (Julie Carmen))
Insomnia (2006 TV Tokyo edition) (Rachel Clement (Maura Tierney))
Intelligence (Lillian Strand (Marg Helgenberger))
The Jane Austen Book Club (Jocelyn (Maria Bello))
Jaws 2 (2022 BS Tokyo edition) (Ellen Brody (Lorraine Gary))
Joe Versus the Volcano (DeDe (Meg Ryan))
K-9 (1993 TV Asahi edition) (Tracy (Mel Harris))
Killing Eve (Carolyn Martens (Fiona Shaw))
King Kong (Ann Darrow (Fay Wray))
L.A. Confidential (Lynn Bracken (Kim Basinger))
The Last Boy Scout (Sarah Hallenbeck (Chelsea Field))
A League of Their Own (Dorothy Hinson (Geena Davis))
Leatherface (Verna Sawyer (Lili Taylor))
Léon: The Professional (Mathilda's Mother (Ellen Greene))
Liar Liar (Audrey Reede (Maura Tierney))
Limitless (Nasreen 'Naz' Pouran (Mary Elizabeth Mastrantonio))
Looney Tunes: Back in Action (Kate Houghton (Jenna Elfman))
Magnolia (Linda Partridge (Julianne Moore))
The Man Who Cried (Lola (Cate Blanchett))
Master Z: Ip Man Legacy (Tso Ngan Kwan (Michelle Yeoh))
The Meddler (Marnie Minervini (Susan Sarandon))
Mindscape (Michelle Greene (Saskia Reeves))
Mission: Impossible – Fallout (Erica Sloane (Angela Bassett))
Mojin: The Lost Legend (Ying Caihong (Lin Xiaoqing))
Mulan (Hua Li (Rosalind Chao))
The Ninth Gate (Liana Telfer (Lena Olin))
Nothing but Trouble (Renalda (Bertila Damas))
The Omen (Mrs. Baylock (Mia Farrow))
Pacific Heights (Stephanie MacDonald (Laurie Metcalf))
Police Story 3: Super Cop ("Jessica" Yang Chien-Hua (Michelle Yeoh))
The Purple Rose of Cairo (Cecilia (Mia Farrow))
R.I.P.D. (Mildred Proctor (Mary-Louise Parker))
Rocky Balboa (Marie (Geraldine Hughes))
The Rosa Parks Story (Rosa Parks (Angela Bassett))
Ruby Sparks (Gertrude (Annette Bening))
The Sea Inside (Julia (Belén Rueda))
Star Trek: The Next Generation (Deanna Troi (Marina Sirtis))
Star Trek: Nemesis (Deanna Troi (Marina Sirtis))
Still Alice (Alice Howland (Julianne Moore))
Striking Distance (Officer Jo Christmas/Tpr. Emily Harper (Sarah Jessica Parker))
Stuart Little (Eleanor Little (Geena Davis))
Sully (Lorraine Sullenberger (Laura Linney))
Survivor (Ambassador Maureen Crane (Angela Bassett))
Suspiria (1986 TV Tokyo edition) (Sara (Stefania Casini))
The Tailor of Panama (Louisa Pendel (Jamie Lee Curtis))
Teenage Mutant Ninja Turtles II: The Secret of the Ooze (April O'Neil (Paige Turco))
Tenet (Priya (Dimple Kapadia))
The Terminator (1992 VHS edition) (Sarah Connor (Linda Hamilton))
Third Person (Elaine (Kim Basinger))
The Tiger and the Snow (Vittoria (Nicoletta Braschi))
Tomb Raider (Ana Miller (Kristin Scott Thomas))
Twin Peaks (Laura Palmer and Maddy Ferguson (Sheryl Lee)
Twin Peaks (2017) (Laura Palmer (Sheryl Lee))
Vantage Point (Rex Brooks (Sigourney Weaver))
Village of the Damned (Jill McGowan (Linda Kozlowski))
Virus (Nadia Vinogradova (Joanna Pacuła))
Wasabi (2004 TV Tokyo edition) (Sofia (Carole Bouquet))
Willow (film) (Sorsha (Joanne Whalley))
Willow (TV series) (Queen Sorsha (Joanne Whalley))
The Wedding Singer (Linda (Angela Featherstone))
When Harry Met Sally... (Sally Albright (Meg Ryan))
Zombi 2 (1982 TBS edition) (Anne Bowles (Tisa Farrow))

Animation
Batman: The Animated Series (Catwoman)
Delgo (Empress Sedessa)
Dinosaur (Plio)
Finding Dory (Jenny)
Jetsons: The Movie (Jane Jetson)
Sinbad: Legend of the Seven Seas (Eris)
Star Trek: Lower Decks (Deanna Troi)
Steven Universe (Yellow Diamond)
Tinker Bell (Queen Clarion)
Tinker Bell and the Lost Treasure (Queen Clarion)
Tinker Bell and the Secret of the Wings (Queen Clarion)
Tinker Bell and the Pirate Fairy (Queen Clarion)

Awards

References

External links 
  
 Gara Takashima at Ryu's Seiyuu Info
 
 
 

1954 births
Living people
Aoni Production voice actors
Japanese video game actresses
Japanese voice actresses
Voice actresses from Tokyo
20th-century Japanese actresses
21st-century Japanese actresses